Martino Carbonaro, o sia Gli sposi fuggitivi was the last of fifty-one operas written by Italian composer Giuseppe Gazzaniga. The farsa has an Italian libretto by Giuseppe Foppa and premiered at the Teatro San Moisè in Venice, Italy in 1801.

Roles

References

1801 operas
Italian-language operas
Operas by Giuseppe Gazzaniga
Farse
Operas